R343 road may refer to:
 R343 road (Ireland)
 R343 road (South Africa)